Lương Chí Dũng (D without Đ is pronounced "Zung", born 21 January 1985) is a Vietnamese professional pool player. He reached the quarter-finals in the 2006 Men's World Nine-ball Championship before losing to Li He-wen.  In 2007 he reached the round of 32, before losing to Satoshi Kawabata from Japan.

He has won two silver medals at South East Asian Games, and made the semi-finals of the 2006 World Cup of Pool.

References

External links
2007 World Pool Championships profile

Living people
1985 births
Vietnamese pool players
Place of birth missing (living people)
Cue sports players at the 2010 Asian Games
Cue sports players at the 2006 Asian Games
Southeast Asian Games gold medalists for Vietnam
Southeast Asian Games silver medalists for Vietnam
Southeast Asian Games medalists in cue sports
Competitors at the 2005 Southeast Asian Games
Asian Games competitors for Vietnam